Atheris mabuensis, the Mount Mabu forest viper, is a species of venomous snake in the family Viperidae. The species is endemic to Mozambique.

Discovery
On examination in the Port Elizabeth Museum (BayWorld, acronym PEM) herpetological collection by Prof. Bill Branch, the specimen was identified as a member of the genus Atheris, which had never previously been recorded from Mozambique and which, moreover, represented a substantial southern range extension for the genus.

References

External links
Google search for images

mabuensis
Snakes of Africa
Reptiles of Mozambique
Endemic fauna of Mozambique
Reptiles described in 2009
Taxa named by William Roy Branch